Mitchell John Hancox (born 9 November 1993) is an English professional footballer who plays as a left-back or central midfielder for  club York City. He has played in the English Football League for Birmingham City, Crawley Town and Milton Keynes Dons.

Hancox began his career with hometown club Birmingham City, for whom he made his Football League debut in October 2012. In the 2015–16 season, he spent three months on loan to League Two club Crawley Town. Released by Birmingham at the end of that season, Hancox signed for National League club Macclesfield Town in August 2016. After two years, during which he helped Macclesfield win the 2017–18 National League title, he moved on to Milton Keynes Dons. Hancox joined his Solihull Moors in May 2019, spent time on loan to another National League club, Harrogate Town at the end of that year, and was released in 2021. He then signed for Hereford, and joined York City on loan later that year. He signed for York permanently in June 2022 after helping them to promotion to the National League.

Early life
Hancox was born in Solihull, West Midlands. He has three older brothers; the eldest, Matthew, was seriously wounded in 2011 while serving in Afghanistan with the Royal Marines. Hancox was recruited into Birmingham City's youth system at the age of eight after being noticed playing in a six-a-side competition. As a youngster, he was a Birmingham City supporter, and particularly admired full-backs Jeff Kenna and Martin Grainger and wing-back Stan Lazaridis.

While still a 15-year-old Lyndon School student, he played for Birmingham's reserve team. He was picked out as "one of the bright spots of the evening from a home perspective" in a heavy defeat to Arsenal in the 2009–10 Premier Reserve League, and described by then Academy manager Terry Westley as "one of the few players to come out with any credit" from a defeat to Leamington in the Birmingham Senior Cup. On leaving school, he began a two-year scholarship with Birmingham City in July 2010.

Career

Birmingham City

His first competitive involvement with Birmingham City's first team came when he was an unused substitute for the 2011–12 Europa League play-off round second leg against Nacional. Hancox signed his first professional contract, of six months, in May 2012, and was given a first-team squad number in August of that year.

Hancox made his competitive debut in the 1–0 home defeat by Huddersfield Town in the Championship on 6 October, as an 80th-minute substitute for the injured Curtis Davies. He played at left-back, allowing Paul Robinson to move to centre-back, and according to the Birmingham Mail, "can be pleased with his urgent and determined contribution in the last 10 minutes. He's only on a six-month contract but would sweat blood for his boyhood club." A few days later, he was given a six-month extension to his contract. When Robinson took over from Steven Caldwell as first-choice centre-back, Hancox was able to establish himself at left-back. He ended the season with 20 appearances, including 14 starts, and signed a new three-year contract.

With David Murphy still recovering from injury, Hancox hoped to establish himself as first choice at left-back, but a bruised testicle sustained in training and the loan signing of Shane Ferguson obstructed his progress. His first appearance of the season was in mid-September, as a substitute with Birmingham already 3–0 down at Burnley, followed by two League Cup ties, the second of which, at home to Stoke City, was 4–4 after extra time. Hancox volunteered to take the first penalty in the shootout, but his powerful kick struck the top of the crossbar and went over; Birmingham went on to lose the shootout. A run of games in November was halted by a knee injury, and ankle damage put an end to another run in the new year. He returned for the last few matches of the season, with Birmingham in danger of relegation. Needing at least a point from the final fixture, away to Bolton Wanderers and for other results to go in their favour, Hancox came on at half-time, and two minutes after Bolton took a two-goal lead, he crossed for Nikola Žigić to score with a header. Well into stoppage time, Paul Caddis scored the equaliser that kept Birmingham in the second tier.

In the 2014 close season, Lee Clark signed left-back Jonathan Grounds, who was almost ever-present under the management both of Clark and his successor Gary Rowett. Hancox played only one first-team match in 2014–15, in the FA Cup against Blyth Spartans, but he was a member of the 2015 Birmingham Senior Cup-winning team, consisting mainly of reserve-team players but also including first-teamers Matt Green and Žigić, who was making his last appearance for the club.

Crawley Town (loan)
After just one League Cup appearance in 2015–16, Hancox joined League Two club Crawley Town on a month's loan on 2 October 2015. He went straight into the starting eleven for the next day's visit to Plymouth Argyle, which Crawley lost 2–1 to a very late goal. In his second League Two match, at home to Leyton Orient, he scored his first senior goal. The score was 1–1 when Orient's goalkeeper Alex Cisak put the ball behind from Hancox's cross. Hancox himself took the corner, and when it was cleared he hit the loose ball past Cisak at his near post. He then made the pass that put Rhys Murphy through on goal, Murphy was fouled for a penalty that put Crawley two goals ahead, and the team held on for a 3–2 win. After he started all seven of Crawley's matches during his first month with the club, his loan was extended for a second month, and then a third. He finished his loan spell with two goals from sixteen appearances in all competitions.

Hancox played no more first-team football after returning to Birmingham. His last appearance for the club was as captain of the reserve team in the 2016 Birmingham Senior Cup final defeat to National League North champions Solihull Moors. Anxious for regular football, he was released when his contract expired at the end of the season; he had been with the club for fourteen years, and made 40 first-team appearances without scoring.

Macclesfield Town
Hancox signed for National League club Macclesfield Town on 4 August 2016. He made his debut two days later in the opening match of the season, a 2–1 win against Torquay United, but in his third match, a 3–1 defeat of Braintree Town, he conceded a penalty and was sent off for two yellow cards. In December 2016, Hancox signed a new deal with Macclesfield to run until the end of the 2017–18 season. As well as at left-back, he also featured as a holding midfielder for Macclesfield. He finished his first season with 38 National League appearances and 6 goals, which included a hat-trick against Boreham Wood in March 2017, and helped his team reach the 2017 FA Trophy Final against York City. He was fouled for the free kick that led to Rhys Browne making the score 1–1, but Macclesfield finished on the losing side.

Hancox scored his second hat-trick for Macclesfield on 1 January 2018 in a 4–1 win away to FC Halifax Town. He finished the 2017–18 season with 7 goals in 39 appearances as Macclesfield were promoted to League Two as National League champions.

Milton Keynes Dons
Hancox rejected Macclesfield's offer of a new contract, and signed for newly-relegated League Two club Milton Keynes Dons on 21 June 2018 on a one-year contract. However, following limited first team opportunities, Hancox was one of ten players released by the club at the end of the 2018–19 season.

Solihull Moors
Hancox signed for National League club Solihull Moors on 24 May 2019 on a two-year contract. He made nine league appearances in the first few weeks of the season, but only two were starts. After two months during which his only appearance was in the Scottish Challenge CupSolihull Moors were one of eight non-Scottish participantshe joined another National League team, Harrogate Town on loan until 5 January 2020; striker Sam Jones made a similar move in the opposite direction. He made five National League appearances for Harrogate and a further ten for Solihull Moors before the season was curtailed because of the COVID-19 pandemic. In 2020–21 he was a regular in the matchday squad, and made 20 league appearances of which nine were as a starter, before being released when his contract expired at the end of the season.

Hereford and York City

Hancox signed for National League North club Hereford on 18 June 2021. Having begun the season as a regular in the side, his appearances became intermittent, and in late October Hancox went on a month's loan at another National North club, York City, managed by Steve Watson, with whom he had worked at Birmingham and Macclesfield. His loan was extended initially until January 2022 and then for the rest of the season. Hereford manager Josh Gowling said his club had intended to bring Hancox back into the squad in January 2022 but could not do so for financial reasons. He was part of the York team that earned promotion to the National League, playing in their 2–0 win over Boston United on 21 May in the National League North play-off final. Hancox was released by Hereford at the end of the season before signing for York permanently on 23 June on a one-year contract.

Career statistics

Honours
Macclesfield Town
FA Trophy runner-up: 2016–17
National League: 2017–18

York City
National League North play-offs: 2022

References

External links

Profile at the York City F.C. website

1993 births
Living people
Sportspeople from Solihull
Footballers from the West Midlands (county)
English footballers
Association football defenders
Association football midfielders
Birmingham City F.C. players
Crawley Town F.C. players
Macclesfield Town F.C. players
Milton Keynes Dons F.C. players
Solihull Moors F.C. players
Harrogate Town A.F.C. players
Hereford F.C. players
York City F.C. players
English Football League players
National League (English football) players